Ty Classic Plush are a line of popular stuffed animals, made by Ty Warner Inc., which was later renamed as Ty Inc. in 2000. Each toy is lightly stuffed which allowed them to be posable rather than the traditional rigid singular pose and the feet of each toy has cloth lined bean bags made with either (see PVC and PE) pellets giving the plush an anchor to hold their pose.

History
Ty Warner begins his own line (1983–1985) Very little is known, its possible that at this time the Ty logo was not used yet and it is unknown if the tags would have been recognizable.

Ty Inc. Production (1986–present) Ty created Ty Inc. and began creating his plush line with the "Himalayan Cats". including:

1001 Angora          White 20 inch
1002 Baby Angora     White 10 inch
1003 Jasmine         Cream 20 inch
1004 Baby Jasmine    Cream 10 inch
1005 Bijan           Grey  20 inch
1006 Baby Bijan      Grey  10 inch
1007 Kasha           Ginger 20 inch
1008 Baby Kasha      Ginger 10 inch
2001 Snowball        White 20 inch
2002 Baby Snowball   White 10 inch
2003 Kimchi          Ginger 20 inch
2004 Baby Kimchi     Ginger 10 inch
2005 Butterball      Cream 20 inch
2006 Baby Butterball Cream 10 inch
2007 Oscar           Grey  20 inch
2008 Baby Oscar      Grey  10 inch
3000 Schnapps        White Dog 20 inch
3001 Baby Schnapps   White Dog  10 inch
3002 Super Schnapps  White Dog  32 inch
These were all featured in a 1987 flyer except Snowball and all have tush tags with the year 1986.
 

Baby Tasha #2006 (10 inch Grey with black Accents) was featured in Beanie Mania II page 4, this example was featured in the Collier Museum Beanie Baby Exhibit in 1998.

In early 2014 Baby Cesha #2002 (10 inch White with Grey accents) surfaced on eBay and was confirmed by Becky Estenssoro to have never been documented previously in any Ty catalogue or value guide prior to this meaning this is the first time this example has been documented to exist.

What is most notable about these two examples is Ty Warner in interview commented that early in his career "he had 10 styles of the same Himalayan cat in 10 different colors. Each cat had its own name."  Prior to the discovery of Baby Cesha, only 9 names were known (Angora, Jasmine, Bijan, Kasha, Snowball, Kimchi, Butterball, Tasha, and Oscar) now with the addition of Cesha we now know the names of all ten cats Ty was referring to.

Beyond the Himalayan cats (1987). Angel, Ginger. Peaches, and Smokey are often referred to as the original Himalayan cats but were not the original Himalayan cats. These names are only paired with tush tags with the year 1987 thus previous Himalayan cats with the year 1986 are the true Himalayan cats.  These four cats were actually released alongside not only dogs but monkeys, more cats, bears, a lamb, and a pig.

1001H Angel    White  Himalayan (Replaced Angora)
1003H Peaches  Cream  Himalayan (Replaced Jasmine)
1005H Smokey   Grey   Himalayan (Replaced Bijan)
1007H Ginger   Ginger Himalayan (Replaced Kasha)
1009	Licorice	Cat	Black
1111	Al E. Cat	Cat	Orange Tabby
1112	Shadow		Cat	Black Cat with White Socks
2001	Charlie		Dog	Yellow Lab
2002	Fritz		Dog	Dalmatian
3001	Max		dog	White (Replaced Schnapps)
3002	Super Max	dog	White (Replaced Super Schnapps)
5000	Beanie Bear	Bear	Brown or Gold
5001	McGee		Bear	Brown
5002	Snowball	Bear	White
5003	Blackie		Bear	Black
6002	Arnold		Pig	Pink Pig
7000	Mischief	Monkey	White
7001	Jake		Orangutan, White 12"
7002	Super Jake	Orangutan, White 16"
8001	Lovie		Laydown Lamb	White

1989 Additions
1114	Chi-Chi	Cheetah 
1115	Harris	Lion
1116	Elmer	Elephant 
1117	Freddie	Frog
1118	Patti	Panther
5004	Cinnamon	Bear
5005	Ping Pong	Panda Bear
5006	Kasey	Koala Bear (Brown)
6001	Petunia	Pig
7001	Jake	Orangutan 
7002	Big Jake	Orangatan, Brown 16"
8000	Beanie Tan Bunny	
8002	Peter	Brown Laydown Bunny
9001	Super Jake	Orangutan, Brown 55"
9002	Super Fritz	dalmatian
9003	Super Petunia	Pig
9004	Super Chi-Chi	Cheetah

1990 Additions
1110	Sherlock Cat (Shadow with white tip tail)
1120	Tygger	Tiger
2003	Barney	Black Lab
2004	Sparky	dalmatian
2005	Buster	Yellow Lab 
5006	Kasey	Koala Bear (Grey)
5008	Sugar	White Bear
5009	Midnight	Black laydown Bear
5010	Oreo	Panda laydown Bear
5011	Big Beanie Bear	
7100	Jake Orangutan, White	
7001	Mischief	Monkey, White
7002	Mischief	Monkey, Brown
7100   Jake White
7101	Jake Auburn	
7102	Jake Brown	
7200	Big Jake White	
7201	Big Jake Auburn	
7202	Big Jake Brown	
7301	George	Gorilla 
7302	Big George	Gorilla 
8003	Rosie	Grey laydown Bunny
8004	Lillie	Lamb
8009	Bandit	Racoon (Grey)
8011	Big Beanie Bunny Tan	
8017	Freddie	
9003	Super Arnold	Pig
9004	Super Tygger	Tiger
9006	Super Buddy	Black Bear

1991 Additions
1114	Patches	Cat
2001	Scruffy Gold 	dog
2006	Yorkie	dog
2007	Winston	dog
5004	Honey	Bear
5012	Scruffy	Bear
5100	Beanie Bear Brown	Bear
5101	Beanie Bear Black	Bear
5102	Beanie Bear White	Bear
5200	Big Beanie Bear	Bear
5201	Big Beanie Bear Black	Bear
5202	Big Beanie Bear Auburn	Bear
5300	Curly Tan	Bear
5301	Curly Dark Brown	Bear
5302	Curly Sweater	Bear
5400	PJ	Bear
5500	1991 Collectable Bear 	Bear
7400	Misty	Seal, Laydown
7414	Chi-Chi	
7415	Harris	
7416	Elmer	
7420	Tygger	
7421	Tygger White	
7422	Twiggy	Giraffe
8005	Angora	Bunny White Laydown
8006	Domino	Bunny Black and White Laydown
8007	Clover	
8008	Petunia	
8010	Freddie	
8012	Big Beanie Bunny White
8015	Peepers	Chick
9000	Super Scruffy	Bear
9002	Super Sparkey	Dalmatian
9005	Super McGee	Bear
9007	Super George	Monkey
9008   Jumbo George Gorilla 48"
9009	Super Snowball	White Bear
9010	Super Ping Pong	Panda Bear
9011	Super Scruffy	dog
9012	Super PJ	Bear
9020 Jumbo PJ Brown 40" Bear

1992 Additions
1115	Maggie	Cat
2000	Scruffy Bear cream/white	
2009	Buckshot	
2010	Spanky	
2011	Rusty	
5011	Baby Buddy	Bear
5013	Scruffy Cream	
5303	Shaggy Gold 	
5304	Shaggy Brown 
5304	Rags	
5500	1992 Collectible Bear Limited to 5000 and later produced as Edmond
5600	Prayer Bear White	
5601	Prayer Bear Gold	
7423	Wally	
8016	Hooters	
8017	Curly Bunny	
8018	Curly Bunny White	
8019	Baby Lovie	
9013	Large Scruffy	Bear
9014	Large Shaggy Gold	Bear
9015	Big Shaggy	Bear
9016	Jumbo Shaggy Gold	40" Bear
9017	Jumbo Shaggy Brown	40" Bear
9018	Large Curly	Bear
9019	Large Curly	Bear

1993 Additions
1116	Socks	
1117	Mittins Orange	
1118	Mittens Silver	
2013	Toffee	
5015	Rufus	
5016	Baby PJ	Bear
5017	Baby Curly	Bear
5019	Buddy	Bear
5305	Shaggy Tan 18	
7415	Otto	
7419	Shivers	
8019	Lovie	
8020	Baby Lovie	
8021	Baby Petunia	
8022	Chestnut	
8023	Baby Clover	Cow
8024	Baby Curly Bunny White	
8025	Baby Curly Bunny White	
9015	Large Shaggy Brown	Bear
9026   Jumbo Shaggy Tan 40" Bear

1994 Additions
2002	Timber	
2003	Sarge	
2005	Charlie	Dog
2008	Cinders	
2009	Bo	
5006	Pudgy	Bear
5011	Shadow	Bear
5018	Baby Curly	Bear
5100	Baby PJ White	Bear
5200	PJ White	Bear
7001	Rascal	
7101	Josh	
7421	Zulu	Zebra
8000	Nibbles	
8006	Whinnie	
9003	Large Curly Bunny	
9006	Big Pudgy	Bear
9011	Large Rusty 	
9014	Large PJ White	Bear
9016 Jumbo PJ White 40" Bear

1995 Additions
1116	Screech	(1117 Scratch introduced in 1996)
2001	Honey	
2004	Pierre	
2010	Elvis	
2012	Sparky	
5002	Rumples Red	
5003	Rumples pink/Green	
5007	Sugar (White Pudgy)	Bear
5008	Lazy	Bear
5010	Sam	
5014	Ruffles	
5200	Baron	Bear
7000	Tango White	
7002	Tango Tan	
7100	Mango White	
7102	Mango Brown	
7418	Dakota	
7419	Arctic	
7421	Sahara	
7423	Bengal	
8004	Angora	
9009	Large Moonbeam	Bear
9015	Large Pumpkin 26	Bear
9016	Jumbo Rumples 40"	Bear
9017	Jumbo Pumpkin 40"	Bear

References

Stuffed toys